KSMS may refer to:

 KSMS-FM, a radio station (90.5 FM) licensed to Point Lookout, Missouri, United States
 KSMS-TV, a television station (channel 67) licensed to Monterey, California, United States
 Sumter Airport (ICAO code KSMS)